Jeff Gill  is an American animator, director, and voice actor. He is best known for animating on the show South Park as well as his work with StoryBots in which he voices the character Bing. He directed the series StoryBots Super Songs and has won multiple Emmy awards for his work on Ask the StoryBots including Outstanding Directing in an Animated Program and Outstanding Writing for a Preschool Animated Program.

Career
While attending the Savannah College of Art and Design Jeff received national attention for various projects, including his 2nd place viral video "Wheee!" for the 2006 Firefox Flicks online competition.

After graduating in 2007, Jeff moved to Los Angeles and worked for various animation studios including Sprite Animation Studios and JibJab. From 2008-2010 he animated for the television show South Park and contributed to many notable episodes, including the Emmy award winning Margaritaville. In 2011 he returned to JibJab as their Director of eCards where he oversaw the production of their online greeting cards, many of which included footage of him dancing. In addition to eCards, he also helped produce several of their animated shorts including political cartoons and Year In Reviews.

In 2014 Evan Spiridellis and Gregg Spiridellis began the children's entertainment brand StoryBots, and asked Jeff to direct several educational animated music videos on topics such as Dinosaurs and Outer Space. Jeff also provided several voices to these characters, as well as those in several other series including the singing squash, carrot, and turnip in the Vegetables videos.

In 2012 production began on Ask The StoryBots where Jeff can be heard lending his voice to the character Bing, as well as many other secondary StoryBots. During this time Jeff was also asked to direct a second series titled StoryBots Super Songs which combined the company's collection of music videos with new animated segments and live-action kid interviews into standard length episodes. In 2017 Jeff co-directed A StoryBots Christmas with Evan Spiridellis.

References

External links
 

Living people
American male voice actors
21st-century American male actors
Year of birth missing (living people)